Nuzhat Tasnia (born 31 December 1996) is a Bangladeshi cricketer. In November 2021, she was named in Bangladesh's team for the 2021 Women's Cricket World Cup Qualifier tournament in Zimbabwe. In January 2022, she was named as one of three reserve players in Bangladesh's team for the 2022 Commonwealth Games Cricket Qualifier tournament in Malaysia. The following month, she was named as one of two reserve players in Bangladesh's team for the 2022 Women's Cricket World Cup in New Zealand.

References

External links
 
 

1996 births
Living people
People from Gaibandha District
Bangladeshi women cricketers
Bangladesh women One Day International cricketers
Bangladesh women Twenty20 International cricketers
Chittagong Division women cricketers
Sylhet Division women cricketers
Rangpur Division women cricketers
Asian Games medalists in cricket
Cricketers at the 2014 Asian Games
Asian Games silver medalists for Bangladesh
Medalists at the 2014 Asian Games